Kerma may refer to:

 Kerma (ancient city)
 Kerma Basin, a low-lying area by the River Nile in Sudan
 Kerma culture, an ancient civilization in modern-day Sudan
 Kerma Museum, a museum in northern Sudan
 KERMA, a quantity in radiation physics
 List of monarchs of Kerma